Halawah (حلاوة) is a village in Ajloun Governorate, Jordan. Along with Al Hashimiyya and Al Wahadinah, it makes up the Ash Shefa Municipality.

History
It had a population of 14 Muslim households and 1 Muslim bachelor. They paid a fixed tax-rate of 25%  on various  agricultural products, including wheat, barley, olive trees, goats and beehives, in addition to  occasional revenues; a total of  2,760 akçe. 

In 1838  Halawah's inhabitants were predominantly Sunni Muslims.

The Jordanian census of 1961 found 972 inhabitants in Halawa.

Demographics 
As of the census of 2010, there were 8,647 people, and 14 families residing in the village.

Climate 
Halawah's climate is typified by warm, dry summers followed by cold, rainy winters with short transitional seasons in between.

Transportation 
Halawah is served by Bus services to Ajloun and Irbid. A driving service for many residents to Amman passes through Ajloun.

References

Bibliography

External links
 Satellite Images of Halawah
Weather information for Halawah
 Video of Halawah showing the terrain

Populated places in Ajloun Governorate